Muhammad Ejaz Shafi is a Pakistani politician who was a Member of the Provincial Assembly of the Punjab, from 2002 to May 2018.

Early life and education
He was born on 1 May 1969 in Khanpur.

He has the degree of the Bachelor of Arts.

Political career
He was elected to the Provincial Assembly of the Punjab as a candidate of Pakistan Muslim League (Q) (PML-Q) from Constituency PP-290 (Rahimyar Khan-VI) in 2002 Pakistani general election. He received 22,531 votes and defeated a candidate of Pakistan Awami Tehrik.

He was re-elected to the Provincial Assembly of the Punjab as a candidate of PML-Q from Constituency PP-290 (Rahimyar Khan-VI) in 2008 Pakistani general election. He received 24,751 votes and defeated a candidate of Pakistan Peoples Party.

He was re-elected to the Provincial Assembly of the Punjab as a candidate of Pakistan Muslim League (N) from Constituency PP-290 (Rahimyar Khan-VI) in 2013 Pakistani general election.

References

Living people
Punjab MPAs 2013–2018
1969 births
Pakistan Muslim League (N) politicians
Punjab MPAs 2002–2007
Punjab MPAs 2008–2013